Soane Tonga'uiha (born 21 January 1982) is a Tongan-born, New Zealand-educated, rugby union player and coach. He plays for Chinnor and internationally for Tonga. His position of choice is loose-head prop, although he sometimes plays at tight-head. He is known for his large size and fierce runs.

Club career

Tonga’uiha moved from Tonga to Auckland, New Zealand with his family at the age of eight. At first, in Auckland, he played rugby league. He played rugby union from the age of 15 when he went to St Peter's College, Auckland the same Catholic school attended by Pat Lam who also taught there. In his final year at school, in 2000, the team went through the season undefeated, winning the Auckland Championship and the New Zealand First XV Knock out competition. The team was inspired by Pat Lam. In 2001, Tonga’uiha joined the Ponsonby rugby club in Auckland.where he was selected for the Auckland Colts side, playing one game against Japan. Tonga’uiha was selected for the Auckland team in 2002 and 2003, playing 12 games and scoring one try.

He first made his break at Bedford Blues as he shone in the 2005/06 season, helping Bedford to a second-place finish behind rugby giants Harlequins, and a Powergen Trophy final place. This, combined with his mobile aggressive ball-carrying, caused Northampton Saints to consider using him. He had also scored a try against Saints in Northampton's victory over Bedford Blues in the Powergen Cup game in December 2004.

Tonga'uiha moved to Northampton Saints at the start of the 2006/07 season and at first – being behind Scotland and British & Irish Lions legend Tom Smith- did not have too many starts in the Guinness Premiership. However, in the 2007/08 season, when Saints found themselves in National League 1, he excelled and earned a number of first team appearances as Northampton Saints cruised towards promotion at the end of the season.

This upward trend in performances continued into the 2008/09 season when – combined with Tom Smith's move towards coaching – Tonga'uiha cemented his place in the match-day squad and has had his fair share of appearances in the starting XV. Tonga'uiha became something of a crowd favourite at Franklin's Gardens with the nickname 'Tiny' – an ironic take on his size.

On 27 January 2010, it was announced that Tonga'uiha would join Saracens at the start of the 2010/11 season. However, in April 2010, he changed his mind and signed a new three-year contract with the Saints.

Soane Tonga'uiha left the Saints at the end of the season 2012–2013 to join the Top 14 Paris club Racing Metro. On 16 May 2014, Soane left Racing Metro to join Top 14 rivals Oyonnax from the 2014–15 season.

On 30 June 2016, Tonga'uiha returned to England to join new Aviva Premiership side Bristol Rugby on a two-year deal, prior to the 2016–17 season.

He was released by Bristol in April 2018. Shortly after Tonga'uiha took up a player/coach role at Ampthill RUFC. Ampthill were promoted to the Championship at the end of the 2018–19 season.

In August 2020 it was confirmed that Tonga'uiha had signed for National League 1 side Chinnor as a player/coach.

International career

New Zealand
Tonga’uiha played for the New Zealand under 19 team in 2001, winning the World Cup.

In 2003, he was selected for the New Zealand under 21 team and again won the applicable age grade World Cup.

Tonga
Tonga'uiha's international career began in 2004 with selection to the newly formed Pacific Islanders rugby union team, a composite team made up of the best players from Samoa, Fiji and Tonga.

His career stalled after that as being a professional playing in Europe restricted him from summer tests for his native Tonga. His sights had been firmly set on the 2007 Rugby World Cup to be held in France – ensuring his and other seasoned professionals playing Europe's participation.

In 2007, he travelled to France as part of the Tongan national rugby team to take part in the 2007 Rugby World Cup, playing in all four games as Tonga upset the form book, beating the US and arch rivals Samoa and pushing eventual winners South Africa and runners-up England all the way. By the end of the tournament, Tonga'uiha had seven caps for Tonga.

Tonga'uiha was again part of his country's World Cup squad for the 2011 event, starting in three and featuring in all four of Tonga's matches, including the impressive 19–14 win in their final game over runners-up France.

References

External links
Northampton profile

Northampton Saints players
Bedford Blues players
Bristol Bears players
Racing 92 players
Oyonnax Rugby players
Auckland rugby union players
Tongan rugby union players
1982 births
Living people
People educated at St Peter's College, Auckland
Tonga international rugby union players
Pacific Islanders rugby union players
Tongan emigrants to New Zealand
Tongan expatriate rugby union players
Expatriate rugby union players in England
Tongan expatriate sportspeople in England
People from Tongatapu
Ampthill RUFC players
Rugby union props